Conghail is a surname. Notable people with the surname include:

Fiach Mac Conghail (born 1964), Irish theatre director and politician
Muiris Mac Conghail (1941–2019), Irish journalist, writer, broadcaster, poet, and film-maker

See also
Congal (disambiguation)